Bradley Robert Brownell (born November 15, 1968) is an American college basketball coach and most recently the previous head basketball coach at Clemson University.  Prior to coming to Clemson, he held the same position at Wright State and UNC Wilmington. He has most recently coached his 13th season at Clemson, losing in the first round of the NIT tournament to Morehead State.

Early life 
Born in Evansville, Indiana, Brownell played high school basketball at William Henry Harrison High School with current Indiana Pacers assistant of player development and Indiana University player Calbert Cheaney. Brownell graduated from DePauw University in 1991, where he was a member of the basketball team and the Sigma Chi fraternity. He immediately went into coaching after graduating. His junior year, Brownell helped lead the Tigers to the NCAA Division III National Championship, where he missed a shot to win the game. He spent one season as an assistant to Jim Crews at the University of Evansville, then spent the next two seasons as an assistant on his former coach Royce Waltman's staff at the University of Indianapolis while earning his master's degree.

Coaching career 
Upon completing his master's degree in 1994, Brownell began his tenure at UNC Wilmington as an assistant to then-head coach Jerry Wainwright. Brownell helped guide the Seahawks to four postseason tournament berths while serving as an assistant, including a memorable upset win over the fourth-seeded USC Trojans in the first round of the 2002 NCAA tournament.

UNC Wilmington 
Following that season, Wainwright left Wilmington to take over at Richmond, and Brownell was promoted to head coach.

During his time as the Seahawks' head coach, Brownell led the Seahawks to Colonial Athletic Association titles and NCAA Tournament berths in 2003 and 2006, narrowly losing in the First Round each season. For his efforts, Brownell was named CAA Coach of the Year in 2003 and 2006.  In his four years, the Seahawks never finished below .500, and the 2005–2006 season produced a school-record 25 wins.

Wright State 
Following the 2006 season, Brownell left UNC Wilmington to take the head coach's job at Wright State, where he made an immediate impact. In his first season at Wright State, Brownell led the Raiders to their first-ever Horizon League title, beating out nationally ranked Butler, coached by fellow DePauw graduate Brad Stevens, to capture both the regular season and tournament titles. The Raiders earned the 14th seed in the West Region, and lost in the first round of the 2007 NCAA tournament to Pittsburgh. The team's 23 wins was a school record on the Division I level. He was named the NABC District 10 coach of the year for being the best college coach in Ohio and Indiana.

Brownell remained head coach at Wright State through the 2010 season. His teams never finished lower than third in conference play, but he was unable to return the Raiders to postseason play. However, he did lead the team to three straight 20 win seasons.

Clemson 
On April 23, 2010, Brownell was named head coach at Clemson, replacing Oliver Purnell.

Brownell led the Tigers to the NCAA tournament in his first year at the school. The Tigers defeated UAB in the First Four, but lost in the Second Round to West Virginia. After two subpar years, the Tigers returned to postseason play in 2014 earning an NIT bid and reaching the semifinals.

The next three years saw the Tigers finishing within three games of .500 each year and in the lower half of the ACC, but they did receive an NIT bid in 2017, losing in the first round.

On March 20, 2017, the school announced that Brownell would return as head coach for at least one more year. During the 2017–18 season, Brownell lead the Tigers to their first 20 win season since 2013–14.  The Tigers finished 11–7 in ACC play, which left them tied for third in the ACC.  The Tigers were selected as a #5 seed in the NCAA tournament, and made it to the Sweet 16, where they lost to #1 seed Kansas.

On July 19, 2018, it was announced that Brownell and Clemson had agreed to a six-year, $15 million contract extension. This extension will keep Brownell at the school through 2024.

On January 11, 2020 Brownell coached the Tigers to the program's first road victory at UNC after 59 attempts.  The series between the two schools began in 1926.

Head coaching record

References

External links
 Clemson Tigers bio

1968 births
Living people
American men's basketball coaches
American men's basketball players
Basketball coaches from Indiana
Basketball players from Indiana
Clemson Tigers men's basketball coaches
College men's basketball head coaches in the United States
DePauw Tigers men's basketball players
Evansville Purple Aces men's basketball coaches
Indianapolis Greyhounds men's basketball coaches
Sportspeople from Evansville, Indiana
UNC Wilmington Seahawks men's basketball coaches
University of Indianapolis alumni
Wright State Raiders men's basketball coaches